The Mail & Guardian 200 Young South Africans is a list of individuals the Mail & Guardian considers to be the most influential 200 Young South Africans for the year.

It was first published in 2006 by then editor-in-chief Ferial Haffajee, and only South Africans under the age of 35 are eligible.

The first edition featured 100 notable South Africans under the age of 35.

Notable recipients

Bryan Habana (2007)
Lauren Beukes (2009)
Trevor Noah (2010)
Julius Malema (2010)
Buyisiwe Sondezi (2012)
Patson Malisa (2015)
Philiswa Nomngongo (2019)

References

External links
 

2006 establishments in South Africa
South African news websites
Weekly newspapers published in South Africa
Mass media in Johannesburg